Vice admiral Faisal Rasul Lodhi  was a flag officer in the Pakistan Navy. Served as Commander Karachi (Comkar), he took the office in October 2020 until March 2021 following the appointment of Ovais Ahmed Bilgrami. During his last assignment, he commanded all Pakistan Navy establishments and training units at Karachi division. He is serving as Vice Chief of the Naval Staff at Naval Headquarters in Islamabad.

Career 
He joined the Pakistan Navy in 1982 and got commission in Operations Branch in 1986. Prior to his Commander Karachi assignment, he served as commander coast. He was also appointed to active lead ships such as commanding officer of PNS Tariq (D-181) besides serving at Director Pakistan Navy Tactical School, and Flag Officer Sea Training. At staff appointments, he served as a director staff at the Navy War College, director naval warfare and operational plans at Islamabad. He was also appointed as fleet operation officer and chief staff officer to Commander Pakistan Fleet and liaison officer to the US Centcom besides serving to Naval Secretary and Vice Chief of the Naval Staff headquartered in Islamabad. In Minister of Defence, at was appointed as Additional Secretary-III. He graduated from the Pakistan Naval War College and National Defence University. He obtained professional courses from Philippines besides obtaining a master's degree in international security and strategic studies from the UK.

Awards and decorations

Effective Dates of promotion

References 

Date of birth missing (living people)
Place of birth missing (living people)
Living people
Pakistan Navy admirals
National Defence University, Pakistan alumni
Pakistan Naval War College alumni
Recipients of Hilal-i-Imtiaz
Year of birth missing (living people)